Distorted Ghost is an EP by Sparklehorse, released in 2000.  It is a collection of b-sides and live tracks.

Critical reception
The Independent called the EP a "perfectly formed six-track stopgap." In its 3-star (out of 5) review, Newsweek likened it to "a more twisted R.E.M., with less heaviosity."

Track listing

Credits
"Happy Man"
Produced & recorded by Eric Drew Feldman at Easley Memphis, and by Mark Linkous at Static King, VA
Mixed by Jack Joseph Puig
Mark Linkous - Voice, Guitar, Keyboard & Percussion
Eric Drew Feldman - Bass, Organ
Nick Vincent - Drums

"Waiting for Nothing", "Happy Place" & "My Yoke Is Heavy"
Made by Mark Linkous at Static King, VA
Piano sampled from "My Yoke Is Heavy" performed by Daniel Johnston

"Gasoline Horseys"
Recorded at Fleece and Firkin, Bristol, England
Mark Linkous - Voice, Guitar
Sofie Michalitsianos - Sings
Scott Minor - Walkman & Yak Bak
Scott Fitzimmons - Bass

"Happy Pig"
Taken from a BBC Radio 1 evening session
Mark Linkous - Voice, Guitar & Tapes
Scott Minor - Drums & Sampler
Jonathan Segel - Guitar
Scott Fitzimmons - Bass

References

External links
Distorted Ghost credits information at Discogs

2000 EPs
Capitol Records EPs
Sparklehorse albums